is the 11th single by Japanese idol duo Wink. Written by Neko Oikawa and Takashi Kudō, the single was released on June 19, 1991, by Polystar Records.

Background and release 
"Manatsu no Tremolo" was used by Panasonic for their RQ-S35 and RQ-S35V headphone commercial. The B-side is "Shake It", which was co-written by veteran musician and producer Kiichi Yokoyama (under the pseudonym "KE-Y").

"Manatsu no Tremolo" became Wink's fourth and final consecutive single to peak at No. 2 on the Oricon's weekly charts. It sold over 225,000 copies and was certified Gold by the RIAJ.

Track listing 
All music is arranged by Satoshi Kadokura.

Chart positions 
Weekly charts

Year-end charts

Certifications

References

External links 
 
 

1991 singles
1991 songs
Wink (duo) songs
Japanese-language songs
Songs with lyrics by Neko Oikawa